The AJR was one of the few motorcycles built in Scotland. AJ Robertson of Edinburgh built 346cc and 490cc Villiers powered single cylinder engine machines between 1925 and 1926. Robertson rode them in many sporting events.

References

External links
AJ Robertson competing in 1925 Isle of Man Senior TT
AJ Robertson competing in 1928 Isle of Man Senior TT

Motorcycle manufacturers of the United Kingdom